Chea Vichea was the leader of the Free Trade Union of Workers of the Kingdom of Cambodia (FTUWKC) until his assassination on Chinese New Year, 22 January 2004. Following his death, he was succeeded in his position at the FTUWKC by his younger brother Chea Mony.

Vichea was shot in the head and chest early in the morning while reading a newspaper at a kiosk in Daun Penh district, Phnom Penh. He had recently been dismissed by the INSM Garment Factory (located in the Chum Chao District of Phnom Penh) as a reprisal for helping to establish a trade union at the company. He also had close affiliations with the opposition Sam Rainsy Party.

Investigation

A few days after Vichea's killing, and facing mounting criticism for their failure to act, Cambodian authorities arrested two men and charged them with the murder.

The first, Born Samnang, was arrested in Prey Veng Province and transferred to Phnom Penh overnight. He initially admitted to the killing but then publicly retracted, claiming to have been tortured into confessing.  Multiple eyewitnesses have placed Born Samnang in a different part of the country at the time of the murder.

The second suspect, Sok Sam Oeun, has consistently denied any involvement and also has alibis placing him in a party with friends at the time of the murder.

The criminal investigation was done by Phnom Penh's Tuol Kork district police and plagued by irregularities. Officers focused on threatening and rounding up those who provided alibis for the suspects, while witnesses were intimidated.'

On 22 March 2004, the case's Investigating Judge, Hing Thirith, threw out the charges against the two men, citing a lack of evidence against them and weak credibility of the police investigation . The next day, Hing Thirith was removed from his position at the Phnom Penh Municipal Court, and his decision to drop charges was subsequently overturned on 1 June 2004 by the Appeals Court Presiding Judge Thou Mony .

The trial took place more than a year after the murder while Born Samnang and Sok Sam Oeun remained in custody in Phnom Penh, despite a Cambodian legal limitation that no one be detained without trial for longer than six months. The case has been taken up by both national and international organisations, including Amnesty International, Human Rights Watch and ILO.

Trial
 
On 1 August 2005, the Phnom Penh Municipal Courts delivered a judgment which was highly criticized  by both local and international organizations, who deemed it unfair and politically biased rather than based on independent and reasonable judgment.

Sok Sam Oeun and Born Samnang were judged guilty after a trial where no witnesses testified against the accused and no forensic evidence was brought to court. Both individuals were sentenced to 20 years in prison and ordered to pay $5,000 compensation each to the family of the victim.

Chea Vichea's family turned down the compensation, stating that they did not believe the two convicted were the real murderers.

References

External links
Human Rights Watch press release: Labor Leader’s Murder Fosters Fear
Amnesty International report: The killing of trade unionist Chea Vichea
CHRAC press release: CHRAC condemns assassination of Chea Vichea, January 22, 2004
CHRAC press release: Unjust Verdict Issued by Phnom Penh Municipal Court in Chea Vichea Case, August 3, 2005
Who Killed Chea Vichea?: Documentary film (2010)
Chea Vichea: portrait of a man who put workers first (Ka-set.info, 2008)

1960 births
People from Kandal province
Cambodian activists
Cambodian trade unionists
Candlelight Party politicians
Assassinated Cambodian people
Assassinated activists
Deaths by firearm in Cambodia
People murdered in Cambodia
2004 deaths